DXZB-TV, channel 13, is a low powered Television station owned and managed by TV-13 Cooperative for Service of Zamboanga under Atty. Gerasimo Acuña and Atty. Susan de los Reyes. Its studios and transmitter are located at JV Bldg., San Jose Panigayan St., Zamboanga City. It was a former affiliated station of Philippine television network Intercontinental Broadcasting Corporation from 1986 to 1991, 1996 to 1998, and 2005 to 2014. Today, the station airs movies and local programs such as news program Accion na Trese and Visia Zamboanga.

Notable former personalities (as IBC Zamboanga)
Julie

References

See also
Intercontinental Broadcasting Corporation

Television stations in Zamboanga City
Intercontinental Broadcasting Corporation stations
Television channels and stations established in 1986